Claudia Taylor "Lady Bird" Johnson High School is a high school in the North East Independent School District in the U.S. state of Texas. It is named after U.S. First Lady Lady Bird Johnson. The school is located in on Bulverde road and TPC Parkway, and serves Stone Oak, Encino Park, Bulverde Village, Cibolo Canyon, Fox Grove, and other neighborhoods of Far North Central San Antonio. It also serves a portion of Timberwood Park.

Facts

Claudia Taylor "Lady Bird" Johnson High School opened on August 28, 2008 for its inaugural year to address the growth and expansion in the north eastern communities of San Antonio, Texas.

The school relieved Ronald Reagan High School, another high school in the North East Independent School District.

The school sits on top of one of the tallest hills in Bexar County and overlooks some of San Antonio. The school mascot is the jaguar and the school flower is the bluebonnet. In 2008 during the first year, the community planted bluebonnets and wildflowers around the campus.

The school's song is based on the hymn Jerusalem, which was Lady Bird's favorite hymn.

Demographics 

US News determined Johnson had an enrolment of 3,086 in the 2019 and 2020 school year. It had an ethnic and racial makeup of 43.9% Hispanic, 36.4% white, 8.2% Asian, 5.5% Black, 5.2% were two or more races, 0.4% American Indian/Alaskan Native, and 0.3% Hawaiian Native/Pacific Islander, totaling to a 63.6% minority enrolment rate. The biological sex distribution is 51% female and 49% male.

The economically disadvantaged rates are far below that of the district( 49.5%) and the state (60.2%) sitting at 19.1%. The reduced priced lunch makes up 4% of the populus and 11% was free lunch program. 

7.7% of the enrolled students are special education and 3.5% are English learners.

Band 
The Lady Bird band most commonly known as the Claudia Taylor Johnson high school band or CTJ for short. The band has had a total of fifty nine TMEA All State band members and have taken up a total of 92 chairs of All State in the years the school has been open. In 2019 the wind ensemble went to Chicago to perform for the midwest band clinic.

Marching Band 
The CTJ band is most notable for their marching band as it is a repetitive Bands of America competition finalist, winning multiple competitions, and  UIL marching band finalist and 2020 state champion.  The band is a four time Bands of America Grand National championship finalist, 16 time Bands of America medalist, and sixty three captions in total over their thirteen marching seasons.

Notable alumni 
 Austin Mahone (class of 2014) — Pop music singer

External links 
Official website
Official band website

References

North East Independent School District high schools
High schools in San Antonio
2008 establishments in Texas